Marianne Strauss (1923-1996) was a Jewish woman who was born in Essen, a city in the industrial region of western Germany.

Early life 
Marianne was born in 1923 in Essen, a city in West Germany. She was born into a rich Jewish family. The father of the Strauss family was a very successful businessman, who did well even in times when everybody else in the countries was doing badly. Although the family feared what the policies of Adolf Hitler could do to them, they felt sheltered because they were wealthy and their region was more tolerant of Jews than the rest of the country. Marianne was shocked when she went to a German high school and experienced racism for the first time.

Life in upheaval 

In October 1941, the Strauss family was to be deported to the Łódź ghetto along with other Jewish families from Essen. However, when they arrived at the railroad station for deportation, officials told them to return home, where they remained until 1943.

An explanation for why they were allowed to remain in Essen is unclear. As indicated in Mark Roseman’s 2000 biography of Marianne, A Past in Hiding (pp. 126-36), Marianne’s father may have bribed German officials. Or, the Abwehr (German counterintelligence unit) sometimes assisted Jews to leave Germany on condition that they serve as spies for the Nazi government under the threat of retaliation against family members who remained in Germany. Or, anti-Nazi elements in the Abwehr were known to have assisted some Jews leave Germany, sometimes using the false pretext that those Jews would be spies for Germany. Roseman found no conclusive proof for which explanation accounts for the Strauss family’s exclusion from deportation to Łódź in 1941.

While this was occurring, the Strauss family was attempting to immigrate to Sweden, America or a South American country. In 1939, Australia and New Zealand had rejected their applications to emigrate. In that same year, Great Britain approved an application but the outbreak of war made that emigration impossible (Roseman, pp. 86-87). An application for emigration to the United States was seemingly nearing approval in 1941 when the U.S. closed its German consulates, bringing that attempt to a close (Roseman, pp. 118-19). Unfortunately, all their efforts to leave Germany failed. 

German authorities wouldn't allow them to leave even with modified papers, and the countries to which they wanted to flee also did not cooperate.

Soon, the Strausses were possibly the only Jewish family in the region who had not been deported. One morning in August 1943, just two days before the family was set to immigrate to Sweden, Gestapo and SS officers appeared at their door. They said that the family had two hours to prepare their luggage for the next transport to the East.

Marianne wrote in her account:The Gestapo officials did not let us out of their sight. The allotted two hours were filled with feverish packing of the few things that we were able to take with us–clothing which, in the unknown destination of a 'work camp', should be practical warm and with luck keep us alive. Then came my moment. The two officials disappeared into the basement, probably to find some loot. Unable to say goodbye to my parents, brother and my relatives, I followed the impulse of the moment, ran out of the house just as I was, with some hundred-mark notes which my father had stuffed into my pocket just a few moments before. I ran for my life, expecting a pistol shot behind me any minute. To go in that way seemed to me a much better fate than the unimaginable one that might await me in Auschwitz or Łódź, in Treblinka or Izbica. But there was no shot, no one running after me, no shouting!

Marianne took refuge with members of the Bund, a left wing organization of German and Jewish people:It was decided that I should never stay for more than three weeks with any one person. We had to prevent the relatives or neighbours from getting suspicious. In any case, I had no food coupons, so my friends (from the bund), carried the great burden of having to feed me from their rations. But I had some money and access to suitcases containing clothes and linen that my parents had hidden some weeks before their deportation, so I was able to barter their contents with farmers in the country in exchange for food or clothing coupons. This was an essential but very dangerous operation.

Life in hiding 
Over the next two years Marianne lived with families of the Bund all around eastern Germany, for short periods of time. While Marianne was living in relative safety, the rest of her immediate family members were in a Jewish Ghetto or a death camp. Marianne lived constantly with uncertainty about them and wondered whether she would ever see them again. Marianne wrote:

On 7 June 1944–on my twenty-first birthday, I was… in Beverstedt and heard on the BBC that the occupants of the transport that had gone from Theresienstadt to Auschwitz on 18 December 1943 had been gassed in the last few days. I knew my parents and my brother had been on the transport to Auschwitz.

The later years 
As Germany's military situation worsened, Strauss fled to Düsseldorf, which fell to the US Army shortly thereafter.

In Düsseldorf, she met her future husband, Basil Ellenbogen who was a doctor and a Captain in the British Army attached to the occupying forces after World War II.

They spent the rest of their lives in Liverpool. She worked as a teacher and also reported to the BBC on the rebuilding of Germany. Marianne died in 1996 and her account was published as a small article in a German Journal. Her story was put together by historian Mark Roseman in his book about her, "The Past in Hiding".

Notes
All quotes excerpted from A Past in Hiding, Strauss' biography by Mark Roseman.

References 

1923 births
1996 deaths
20th-century German Jews
Holocaust survivors
Bundists
Ellenbogen family
Schoolteachers from Merseyside
German emigrants to the United Kingdom